Manjacaze (Manxakadze) is a town in the province of Gaza, Mozambique. It serves as the administrative center of Manjacaze District.

Demographics

Economy 
The town formerly had a cashew processing plant, which was shut down in the early 21st century.
The cashew processing plant was opened up again in 2006, madecaju.

Transport 
Manjacaze was connected to the port city of Xai-Xai by the 762mm gauge Gaza Railway. It is a railway junction.

See also 

 Transport in Mozambique
 Railway stations in Mozambique

Notable inhabitants 

 Paulina Chiziane, author
 Eduardo Mondlane, President of FRELIMO, 1962-1969
 Gabriel Estavao Monjane, tallest African - see List of tallest people

References 

Populated places in Gaza Province